Damba (Paretroplus damii) is a species of cichlid.

Damba may also refer to:

People
 Abukari Damba (born 1968), Ghanaian football goalkeeper
 Damba Zhalsarayev (born 1925), USSR citizen who wrote the Buryat lyrics for the anthem of the Republic of Buryatia
 Dashiin Damba (1908 – ), Mongolian politician
 Fanta Damba (born 1938), Malian jalimuso (Bambara female Griot-singer)
 Mah Damba (born Mah Sissoko, 1965), Malian traditional griot singer.

Other uses
 Damba (municipality), Uíge Province, Angola
 Damba Airport, Damba, Angola
 Damba festival, celebrated in Nalerigu Tamale and Wa in the Northern and Upper West Regions of Ghana
 World Damba Festival, enactments of the Damba festival by Ghanaians living in other parts of the world.
 Damba Island, Lake Victoria, Uganda
 Damba mipentina (Paretroplus maculatus), an endangered species of cichlid native to Madagascar

See also